Nick or Nicholas Baines may refer to:

 Nick Baines (bishop) (born 1957), bishop in the Church of England
 Nick "Peanut" Baines (born 1978), keyboardist of the English indie-rock band Kaiser Chiefs

See also
 Baines
 Nick Bain (born 1979), American politician from Mississippi
 Nicholas Bain (1824–1854), American murderer